Azat Hovhannisyan (born 15 August 1988) is an Armenian professional boxer who challenged for the WBC super-bantamweight title in 2018. As of August 2020, he is ranked as the world's sixth best active super-bantamweight by BoxRec, ninth by The Ring and tenth by the Transnational Boxing Rankings Board.

Professional career
Hovhannisyan made his professional debut on 23 April 2011, losing by unanimous decision (UD) over four rounds against Juan Reyes at the Nokia Theatre L.A. Live in Los Angeles, California.

After compiling a record of 12–2 (10 KOs) he faced Sergio Frias for the vacant WBC Continental Americas super-bantamweight title on 23 September 2017, at The Forum in Inglewood, California. Serving as part of the undercard for the world title fight between Jorge Linares and Luke Campbell, Hovhannisyan captured his first professional title with a wide UD victory. Two judges scored the bout 100–90 and the third scored it 98–92.

He made a successful defence of his regional title in March 2018, defeating Ronny Rios via sixth-round knockout (KO), before challenging WBC super-bantamweight champion Rey Vargas on 12 May at the Turning Stone Resort Casino in Verona, New York. Hovhannisyan suffered his third professional defeat, losing by UD with the judges scorecards reading 118–110, 117–111, and 116–112.

Professional boxing record

References

External links

Living people
1988 births
Sportspeople from Yerevan
Armenian male boxers
Super-bantamweight boxers